John Thomson Dallas (April 15, 1880 – December 4, 1961) was the fifth Bishop of New Hampshire in the Episcopal Church from 1926 to 1948.

Biography
Dallas was born in Waterbury, Connecticut. He studied at Yale University from where he graduated in 1904 with a Bachelor of Arts. He commenced studies in the Union Theological Seminary and graduated in 1908. He was ordained deacon that same year and priest a year later. He also earned doctorate degrees from Dartmouth College, University of Vermont, University of New Hampshire and Berkeley Divinity School. After ordination he served as curate at St John's Church in Waterbury, Connecticut. Later he also served as chaplain and associate headmaster of Taft School. In 1920 he was also appointed as rector of St Thomas' Church in Hanover, New Hampshire. During WWI he did religious work in training camps. In 1925, he was transferred as vicar of St Paul's Cathedral in Boston. In 1925 he was elected and consecrated Bishop of New Hampshire in 1926. He retired in 1948.

References

1880 births
1961 deaths
20th-century American Episcopalians
Episcopal bishops of New Hampshire